Zamarripa is a surname of Spanish origin. Notable people with the surname include:

Angel Zamarripa (1912–1990), Mexican cartoonist
JoCasta Zamarripa (born 1976), American politician
Rafael Zamarripa (born 1942), Mexican painter
Sam Zamarripa, American politician
Vanessa Zamarripa (born 1990), American gymnast

See also 

 Zamarramala

Basque-language surnames